Celebrity Fitness is a fitness center operator with a network of clubs across Indonesia, Malaysia, the Philippines, and India. Every Celebrity Fitness club offers personal training, yoga, spinning / indoor cycling and group fitness programs for its members.

Celebrity Fitness in Indonesia, Malaysia, the Philippines, and India, are separate entities with different shareholders, and managed by different leadership teams.

The Celebrity Fitness brand in Indonesia, Malaysia, and the Philippines is owned by Evolution Wellness Pte. Ltd., which also has Fitness First Asia in its portfolio. Evolution Wellness is helmed by CEO Simon Flint.

In India, it is helmed by CEO Rajat Singh.

Background

Celebrity Fitness was founded in 2003 by John Franklin, Mike Anderson, and JJ Sweeney. Celebrity Fitness commenced operations in February 2004 in Jakarta.

In 2005, Celebrity Fitness entered the Malaysian market with its first club in Kuala Lumpur. This is located at 1 Utama Shopping Centre in Petaling Jaya, Selangor, Malaysia. The Malaysian business expanded in 2009 with the purchase of California Fitness (Malaysia) gyms.

In 2007, the majority shareholding of Celebrity Fitness was acquired by Navis Capital Partners.

In 2012, Celebrity Fitness entered the Singaporean market.

In 2017, Fitness First Asia merged with Celebrity Fitness to create Evolution Wellness Holdings Pte. Ltd., equally co-owned by Oaktree Capital Management and Navis Capital Partners.  However, both brands will remain separate.

In 2018, Celebrity Fitness unveiled a new logo and brand identity in Indonesia and Malaysia.

Countries

Indonesia
Celebrity Fitness was the first gym company of its kind in Indonesia. In 2004, Celebrity opened its first gym in Jakarta's EX Mall at Plaza Indonesia. The company has the largest fitness center network in Indonesia and is the market leader, by the number of clubs and members. As at May 2018, Celebrity Fitness has locations in 11 Indonesian cities Jakarta, Bali, Bandung, Batam, Bogor, Makassar, Medan, Palembang, Semarang, Yogyakarta and Surabaya totaling 36 clubs.

Malaysia
In 2004, Celebrity Fitness opened its first gym at the 1 Utama shopping mall in Petaling Jaya located near Kuala Lumpur. In September 2009, Celebrity Fitness acquired all of California Fitness's gyms in Malaysia.  As at December 2018, Celebrity Fitness currently has 24 clubs in Malaysia.

Singapore
In March 2012, Celebrity Fitness commenced operations in Singapore with its first club at Rochester Mall in Buona Vista. In June 2012, its second club commenced operations at Downtown East in Pasir Ris. There were a total of four Celebrity Fitness clubs in Singapore; however, the Bukit Timah and Downtown East clubs were closed at the end of 2017, while the City Square and Junction 10 clubs were converted to Fitness First.

Turkey
In 2009, Celebrity Fitness opened their first branch in Turkey with its first club at Dalmaz Center in Gayrettepe. In 2010, they closed down their operations due to losses and mismanagement.

India
It has two centres, one in Gurgaon and one in Delhi. In Gurgaon, it is on top floor of JMD mall, MG road and covers entire top floor making it one of the largest gym in India. The company owns two clubs in Delhi (NCR), India, started operation in Gurgaon with its first luxury Club (approx. 30,000 sqft area) in December 2008 in India and secondnd club (approx. 24,500 sq ft) was opened in October 2011 in Rajouri Garden, Delhi, after three years of successful operation in Gurgaon. The company is registered in India in the name "Celebrity Fitness India Pvt. Ltd." Navis Capital has sold its INDIA's shares in August 2014 to  M/S Rockstar Gym Pvt Ltd and Mohammad Kashmeri.

Philippines
It has two centers in Manila; one in One Bonifacio High Street, opened on 10 September 2018, and another in Ayala North Exchange, opened on 8 July 2019.

Thailand
In 2009, Celebrity Fitness opened their first two branches in Thailand; one in Singha Complex, and another in Samyan Mitrtown.

References

External links
 Celebrity Fitness

Health clubs
Medical and health organizations based in Indonesia
Companies based in Jakarta
Health care companies established in 2003
Indonesian brands
Oaktree Capital Management